Green Level is an unincorporated community in southwestern Wake County, North Carolina, United States. It was founded  and is one of the oldest surviving crossroads communities in the county. Although historically connected to the town of Apex, Green Level now lies within the municipal jurisdiction of the town of Cary.

One primary community building is the Cloer Nursery. Cloer Nursery is located near Green Level Baptist Church at the crossroads of Green Level Church Road and Green Level Road West. The remains of the old convenience store are still standing and in use. It was formerly a gas station, but when the law mandated stations to switch out old gas tanks, the Phillips 66 closed. The only commercial businesses in the area are Cloer Nursery and the Green Level Gift Shop.

The core of the community has been designated the Green Level Historic District in 2001.

Green Level Historic District
Green Level Historic District is a national historic district located within Cary. The district encompasses 31 contributing buildings, one contributing site and four contributing structures in the crossroads community of Green Level.

The district developed sometime during the period between roughly 1890 and 1945, and includes notable examples of Colonial Revival and Gothic Revival, style architecture. One of the central buildings of the community is Green Level Baptist Church (1907), located near the crossroads of Green Level Church Road and Green Level West Road. Other notable buildings include the Green Level Community Store (1945), A. C. and Helon Council House, and the Alious H. and Daisey Mills Farm and Store (1916).

References

Populated places in Wake County, North Carolina
Neighborhoods in North Carolina
Populated places established in 1800
Historic districts on the National Register of Historic Places in North Carolina
Colonial Revival architecture in North Carolina
Gothic Revival architecture in North Carolina
National Register of Historic Places in Wake County, North Carolina